Death Wish II  is a 1982 American vigilante action film directed and co-edited by Michael Winner. It is the first of four sequels to the 1974 film Death Wish. It is the second installment in the Death Wish film series. In the story, architect Paul Kersey (Charles Bronson) moves to Los Angeles with his daughter (Robin Sherwood).  After his daughter is murdered at the hands of several gang members, Kersey once again chooses to become a vigilante. Unlike the original, in which he hunts down every criminal he encounters, Kersey only pursues his family's attackers. The sequel makes a complete breakaway from the Brian Garfield novels Death Wish and Death Sentence, redefining the Paul Kersey character.  It was succeeded by Death Wish 3.

The sequel was produced by Cannon Films, which had purchased the rights to the Death Wish concept from Dino De Laurentiis. Cannon executive Menahem Golan planned to direct the film, but Winner returned on Bronson's insistence. The soundtrack was composed by guitarist Jimmy Page. Death Wish II was released in the United States in February 1982 by Filmways Pictures, but like the original, Columbia Pictures handled the international release and Paramount Pictures, via Trifecta Entertainment & Media, handles the television rights. It earned $16.1 million during its domestic theatrical run.

Plot
Roughly eight years since the events of the first film, Paul Kersey has managed to recover from his shattered life and moved on, and is now dating a Los Angeles radio reporter, Geri Nichols. They go to pick up Paul's daughter, Carol, from the mental hospital. They spend the afternoon at a fairground, where Paul's wallet is stolen by a gang, consisting of Nirvana, Punkcut, Stomper, Cutter, and Jiver. The gang splits up when Paul chases them; he goes to pursue Jiver, whom he corners in an alley but lets the hood go after Jiver tells Paul that he does not have the wallet. The gang finds Paul's home address in his wallet and later breaks into his house. They gag and restrain Rosario, Paul's housekeeper, then they began taking turns raping her. When Paul arrives home with his daughter, he is beaten unconscious. Rosario tries to call the police, but Nirvana kills her with his crowbar. They kidnap Carol and take her to their hideout, where one of the gang members rapes her. Carol attempts to escape by running through a plate-glass window, falls onto an iron fence, and is fatally impaled. When the police arrive, Lieutenant Mankewicz asks for help identifying the muggers, but Paul refuses. After Carol's funeral, he takes his Beretta Model 84 handgun to a low-rent inner-city hotel as a base of operations. The next evening, he observes and follows Stomper into an abandoned building as a drug deal is about to be made. Paul shoots one of the dealers and orders the others out before he shoots Stomper twice. The following night, he hears screams from a couple being assaulted in a parking garage by four muggers, which includes Jiver, in a parking garage. Paul kills two rapists and wounds Jiver. Then Paul follows Jiver's blood trail into an abandoned warehouse and kills him.

The LAPD suspect that the murders are the work of a vigilante and ask the NYPD for guidance as they dealt with a vigilante spree years earlier. NYPD Detective Frank Ochoa suspects it may be Paul again and is sent to assist with the case. Ochoa understands that Paul, when caught, will reveal that he was released without being charged for killing the ten muggers in New York City. Ochoa meets with Mankewicz, who suspects that Ochoa is not telling him everything. Ochoa enters Geri's apartment and tells her about Paul's previous vigilante killing spree in New York City. After Paul returns to his house, Geri confronts him about Ochoa's revelation, but he denies it. Ochoa follows Paul to a local square, where Paul is tailing the three remaining gang members. He follows them to an abandoned park, where a major arms and drug deal is underway. A sniper scouts Paul and attempts to kill him, but Ochoa warns Paul and fatally shoots the sniper. Ochoa is mortally wounded by Nirvana, and Paul shoots Cutter in the head and another dealer and wounds Punkcut. The arms dealer tries to get away, but Paul shoots him and causes his car to drive off a cliff and explodes, but Nirvana escapes. Ochoa tells Paul to avenge him before he dies. Paul escapes, and Punkcut dies from his injuries after giving information about Nirvana to the police.

Paul learns from one of Geri's colleagues that the police are preparing a tactical unit to capture Nirvana. He obtains a police scanner and, by monitoring police radio traffic, finds out when and where the arrest is going to take place. He drives to the location to kill him, but Nirvana, under the influence of PCP, slashes his arm and stabs a few officers while he tries to escape. Tried and found criminally insane, he is sent to a mental institution. Geri is writing a story about the case and capital punishment and takes Paul to the hospital to meet the doctor treating Nirvana. While there, Paul steals another doctor's white lab coat and identification card and uses it to enter the asylum and confront Nirvana. After repeatedly stabbing Paul with a shiv, Nirvana ends up plunging his arm into a high-voltage panel, which Paul turns on, fatally electrocuting him. Donald Kay, a sympathetic orderly at the hospital, recognizes Paul from the newspaper coverage of Carol's murder, and gives him three minutes to escape before he rings the alarm. Geri goes to Paul's house, where she finds out that he made a fake doctor's ID. Upon hearing a news report of Nirvana's death on the radio, she realizes that Paul really is the vigilante that Ochoa claimed him to be. She takes off her engagement ring and leaves him, with Paul arriving home moments later.

A few months later, Paul speaks about a new architectural design. He is invited by his employer to a party to celebrate the new design. When Paul is asked if he is able to attend, he answers, "What else would I be doing?" The final scene shows Paul returning to the streets of Los Angeles at night and continuing his vigilante killing spree as the film finishes.

Cast

 Charles Bronson as Paul Kersey / Mr. Kimble
 Jill Ireland as Geri Nichols
 Vincent Gardenia as Lieutenant Frank Ochoa
 J.D. Cannon as New York City District Attorney
 Paul Lambert as New York City Police Commissioner
 Anthony Franciosa as Los Angeles Police Commissioner Herman Baldwin
 Drew Snyder as Los Angeles Deputy Commissioner Hawkins
 Paul Comi as Senator McLean
 Robin Sherwood as Carol Kersey Toby
 Charles Cyphers as Donald Kay
 Ben Frank as Lieutenant Art Mankiewicz
 Michael Prince as Elliot Cass
 Thomas F. Duffy as Charlie "Nirvana" Wilson
 Larry Fishburne as "Cutter"
 Kevyn Major Howard as "Stomper"
 Stuart K. Robinson as "Jiver"
 E. Lamont Johnson as "Punkcut"
 Silvana Gallardo as Rosario
 Robert F. Lyons as Fred McKenzie
 Frank Campanella as Judge Neil A. Lake
 Robert Snively as Dr. Gofeld
 Steffen Zacharias as Dr. Clark
 David Daniels as Lang
 Don Dubbins as Mike
 Buck Young as Charles Pearce
 Jim Galante as Tim Shaw
 Peter Pan as Chinese Landlord
 Jim Begg as Tourist 
 Melody Santangello as Mary, Tourist's Wife
 Karsen Lee as Nirvana's Girl #1
 Leslie Graves as Nirvana's Girl #2
 Henny Youngman as Himself
 William Bogert as Fred Brown (uncredited)
 Terry Leonard as Sniper In Tree (uncredited)

Production

Development
Brian Garfield, author of the original Death Wish novel, was so unhappy with the film version that he wrote his own sequel, Death Sentence. "They'd made a hero out of him", said Garfield. "I thought I'd shown that he'd become a very sick man." The idea to produce a sequel to Death Wish (1974) originated with producers Menahem Golan and Yoram Globus, owners of Cannon Films. They reportedly announced their plans to do so prior to actually securing the rights to the franchise. Dino De Laurentiis, co-producer of the original film, threatened them with a lawsuit unless they properly purchased the rights. He negotiated payments for himself, co-producers Hal Landers and Bobby Roberts, and original author Brian Garfield. The agreement included future payments for each prospective sequel.

In 1980, Cannon briefly hired Garfield to write an adaptation of his sequel to Death Wish, Death Sentence, in 1980. However, Golam and Globus did not want to use Garfield's book, preferring an original story by David Engelbach, Golan, and Hal Landers. After they purchased the rights to the first film from De Laurentiis they also purchased the rights to the characters of the novels from Garfield, meaning they could make a sequel without adapting the original novels. "We think our story is a better film story", said Golan. "You cannot call a film exploitative just because it touches on disturbing issues", said Globus. "Both Death Wish films are a valid comment on American society... the theme of street violence getting out of control is sadly more of a fact of life than it was seven years ago." Garfield later approved a separate adaptation without the character of Paul Kersey directed by James Wan in 2007.

David Engelbach was then asked to write the screenplay. After he saw the final product, he was "somewhat appalled" how the film differed from his original script. His script didn't include any rape scenes, but those were included by Michael Winner to "get his rocks off". However, Engelbach argued that "serious issues - namely, the deteriorating state of our criminal justice system. The actions of the Bronson character are dictated by the inability of the police to prevent crime, the preoccupation of the courts with technical rather than real justice, and the cancerous climate of fear in which we find ourselves today. Paul Kersey is no hero. In his pursuit of vengeance he loses the only emotional relationship of his life and by story's end has become as much a victim of crime as the thugs he leaves dead in his wake".

Casting

Bronson was offered $1.5 million to reprise the role. Jill Ireland was cast in the film because Bronson, her husband, insisted on it. She serves as both the love interest to Paul and the voice of opposition to the death penalty. She was already offered a role in the film's predecessor, Death Wish (1974) but, Charles Bronson refused because he didn't want his wife humiliated and messed around with by the actors who played muggers. After she was hired for this film, Bronson wanted her character not to get raped or killed by the villains of the film. Cannon initially asked Golan to direct the film, but Bronson insisted on instead recruiting Michael Winner, the director of the original. Winner had suffered a downturn in his career since the mid-1970s, with no box-office hit since Death Wish. He agreed to return to the franchise and also took the initiative in revising Engelbach's script. Winner recalled that De Laurentiis was having second thoughts about letting someone else produce the sequel and offered to hire him to do the film for his own production company. Winner refused, and De Laurentiis did not renege on his deal with Cannon. The producer, however, started work on a "clone" of the film. The final result was Fighting Back (1982).

Winner said the sequel was pertinent because "mugging is now a bigger issue in America. It's spread to towns where it was not a problem before. In Beverly Hills, instead of talking about other people's failed movies – thank God, something has stopped them at last – they talk about their muggings." The film introduced significant changes for the character of Paul. One involved his modus operandi as a vigilante. In the original film, Paul would shoot and kill every criminal in his vicinity. In the sequel, he is after five specific criminals who are responsible for the death of his daughter. His single-minded pursuit extends to ignoring other potential targets. He is seen to ignore most thieves, drug dealers, and one violent pimp. Another change involves his abilities. In the first film, his activities as a vigilante rely only on his use of weapons. In the sequel, he is able to beat up men who are considerably younger than himself. While casting the actors for the roles of the villains, Winner gave the actors playing the thugs a lot of creative leeway. They bought their own costumes, designed their own makeup and tested them out on passers-by to see how intimidating they'd look. Laurence Fishburne bought a pair of magician's gloves and waved his knife like a wand, while Kevyn Major Howard waxed his eyebrows and shaved the front of his head to make himself look like a snake. He even developed mannerisms like his insane laugh, slapping his head and twirling a baton from seeing a live drummer in a punk band.

Filming

Among the final revisions of the script was a change in location. The original script set the action in San Francisco, but the revision moved the setting to Los Angeles. Winner said the film was "the same, but different", from the original. "That's what sequels are – Rocky II, Rocky III – you don't see Sylvester Stallone move to the Congo and become a nurse. Here the look of LA is what's different. Besides – rape doesn't date!" Engelbach argued the film raised "serious issues – namely, the deteriorating state of our criminal justice system. The actions of the Bronson character are dictated by the inability of the police to prevent crime, the preoccupation of the courts with technical rather than real justice, and the cancerous climate of fear in which we find ourselves today. Paul Kersey is no hero. In his pursuit of vengeance, he loses the only emotional relationship of his life and by story's end has become as much a victim of crime as the thugs he leaves dead in his wake."

Principal photography began on May 4, 1981, in Downtown Los Angeles and concluded on July 1, 1981, in San Pedro. Filming often lasted twelve hours a day in order to complete it before a Screen Actors Guild strike. The film was shot on location and depicted actual "sleazy" areas of the city. Twenty off-duty men of the LAPD were hired to protect the film cast and crew from potential trouble. A scene involving the abandoned and crumpling Hollywood Hotel was shot in an actual abandoned hotel months before it was demolished. Several of the extras of the film were various locals who were hired to play a bit part or happened to be passing by during a shooting. Among them were drug addicts, a drag queen, Hare Krishnas, and bikers. All were included by the director in an attempt to get an authentic feel of the streets of Los Angeles. Winner tried to keep the mood on the set lighthearted. "Just because a film is terrifying, that doesn't mean the people making it have to be grim", he said. All of the filming happened in Los Angeles, California. Places like San Pedro, Ladera Heights and Hollywood were included.

Silvana Gallardo said the rape scene was "grueling" and took about six days to film. To prepare for the role, she talked to an actual rape victim.

Music

Isaac Hayes was recommended by the producers of the film to compose the score; however, Michael Winner chose former Led Zeppelin guitarist Jimmy Page (who was Winner's neighbor at the time). The opening credits bear Page's signature guitar tone, along with the heavy reverb-laden drum sound that he used with Led Zeppelin. The film's soundtrack was released in February 1982. Portions of the score were sampled by Twiztid in the song "Spiderwebs" from their album Heartbroken & Homicidal.

Release

Theatrical
Cannon Films was able to sell distribution rights to several interested buyers. Theatrical rights in the United States and Canada were purchased by Filmways. The company had recently acquired American International Pictures, known for its exploitation films, and the film would fit right in with their library of genre films. Columbia Pictures purchased the international distribution rights. Paramount Pictures purchased the television broadcast rights for the domestic market. The film was originally intended for release around the Christmas of 1981. Filmways decided to postpone release until February 1982 to face a weaker competition for an audience. The film became the top-grossing film of its opening week.

Home media
The film was first released on VHS and then on DVD. It was released for the first time on 4K Ultra HD Blu-ray in the U.S. on May 31, 2022 by Vinegar Syndrome.

Reception

Box office
The film grossed $16 million in United States theaters, a rare box-office hit for the ailing Filmways. The company still ended 1982 with losses of $52.7 million. It was subsequently purchased by Orion Pictures.

It made a $2 million profit for Cannon Films and made an extra $29 million worldwide.

It has since earned further money at home and abroad through release for the video market. A poll for HBO noted Death Wish II to be higher in demand by paying viewers than Chariots of Fire (1981).

Critical response
Vincent Canby of The New York Times said it was "even more foolish, more tacky, and more self-righteously inhumane than the 1974 melodrama off which it has been spun" and "so lethargic that it fails even to provoke outrage." He particularly criticized the way the film essentially repeats the plot of the original, the contrived incompetence of the police characters, and Jill Ireland's unconvincing performance. Roger Ebert gave it zero stars, noting that he reserves this rating solely for those very few films that are both "artistically inept and morally repugnant." Citing the lethargic tone of the acting and directing, the lack of plot, the lifeless dialogue, and the weak action sequences, he concluded, "while the first film convinced me of Bronson's need for vengeance, this one is just a series of dumb killings." Variety called it "every bit as revolting as... the original".

On Rotten Tomatoes, the film holds an approval rating of 33% based on 19 reviews, with an average rating of 3.58/10. On Metacritic the film has a weighted average score of 11 out of 100, based on 7 critics, indicating "Overwhelming Dislike".

The movie was nominated for a Stinkers Bad Movie Awards for Worst Picture. The film was nominated for a Razzie Awards for Worst Musical Score.

See also
 List of films featuring home invasions

References

External links
 
 
 

1982 films
Death Wish (film series)
1982 action thriller films
1980s crime thriller films
1980s vigilante films
American action thriller films
Columbia Pictures films
Paramount Pictures films
1980s English-language films
Films directed by Michael Winner
Films set in Los Angeles
Films shot in Los Angeles
Golan-Globus films
American rape and revenge films
American sequel films
Filmways films
Films produced by Menahem Golan
Films produced by Yoram Globus
Films scored by Jimmy Page
1980s American films